Francis J. Wald (April 8, 1935 – May 3, 2011) was an American politician who served in the North Dakota House of Representatives from the 37th district from 1978 to 1982 and from 1984 to 2010. He served as Speaker of the North Dakota House of Representatives from 1998 to 2000.

He died of lung cancer on May 3, 2011, in Dickinson, North Dakota at age 76.

References

1935 births
2011 deaths
Speakers of the North Dakota House of Representatives
Republican Party members of the North Dakota House of Representatives